Heinz Gustav Tonn (26 April 1921 – 4 April 2003) was an Australian rules footballer who played with Fitzroy in the Victorian Football League (VFL). Tonn, who was born in Germany, served with the Australian Army in World War II. A follower, Tonn played six games for Fitzroy in the 1947 VFL season. He returned to his original club, Golden Square, in 1948 and won that year's Bendigo Football League award for the best and fairest player. The following season he was appointed captain-coach of Castlemaine and won the award again, for the second season in succession.

References

1921 births
2003 deaths
VFL/AFL players born outside Australia
Australian rules footballers from Victoria (Australia)
Fitzroy Football Club players
Golden Square Football Club players
Castlemaine Football Club players
German emigrants to Australia
Australian Army personnel of World War II